Massarati and the Brain is a 1982 American television film produced by Aaron Spelling.

Plot
A billionaire private detective is looking for missing treasure, with the help of his young geek nephew, his domestic and cook, and a federal agent.

Cast
Daniel Pilon as Mas Massarati
Peter Billingsley as Christopher "The Brain" Massarati
Christopher Hewett as Anatole
Markie Post as Julie Ramsdell
Ann Turkel as Wilma Hines
Camilla Sparv as Dorothea
Kathryn Witt as Diana Meridith
Christopher Lee as Victor Leopold
Kaz Garas as Nick Henry
Gail Jensen as Camille Henry
Heather O'Rourke as Skye Henry
Ricky Supiran as Rocky Henry

References

External links
Massarati and the Brain at BFI
Massarati and the Brain at IMDb
Massarati and the Brain at TCMDB

1982 television films
1982 films
1982 comedy films
1980s adventure comedy films
Films scored by Billy Goldenberg
American detective films
Films directed by Harvey Hart
1980s American films